Chad Simpson (born August 22, 1985) is a former American football Running back. He was originally signed by the Indianapolis Colts as an undrafted free agent in 2008. He played college football at South Florida and Morgan State.

He has also been a member of the Buffalo Bills and Washington Redskins.

College career
Simpson played in 35 games during his four-year college football career. He spent the first two years at South Florida before transferring to Morgan State. In his two years at Morgan State, Simpson became the fourth leading rusher in school history and set the school's single season rushing record in his senior year with 1,402 yards.

Professional career

Indianapolis Colts
Simpson originally signed by the Indianapolis Colts as an undrafted free agent in 2008. He spent the first 5 games of the 2008 season as a member of the Colts practice squad, then served in the final 11 games of the season as a reserve running back and kickoff returner. He also saw action in a Wild-Card Playoff game against the San Diego Chargers.

During the 2009 season, Simpson appeared in 14 games with the Colts and saw action on special teams in three playoff games including Super Bowl XLIV.

Simpson was waived by the Colts on April 11, 2010.

Buffalo Bills
Simpson was signed by the Buffalo Bills on May 11, 2010. He was waived on September 4, 2010.

Washington Redskins
The Washington Redskins signed Simpson on September 21, 2010, after Larry Johnson was released. He was released on July 28, 2011.

Winnipeg Blue Bombers
On January 19, 2012, it was announced that Simpson had signed with the Winnipeg Blue Bombers. Simpson became the Bombers leading running back in his first season in the CFL. He carried the ball 173 times for 1,039 yards (6.0 average) with 5 touchdowns. Simpson played in the first 9 games of his second season with the Bombers until his season was cut in short by a foot injury. At the time of the injury he was 4th in the league in rushing yards with 581 yards on 108 carries (5.4 average) adding 6 touchdowns. He was not resigned by the Bombers following the 2013 CFL season.

Edmonton Eskimos 
After being out of football for one year the Edmonton Eskimos of the Canadian Football League announced the signing of Chad Simpson. Incumbent Eskimos starting running back John White was announced lost for the 2015 CFL season the previous day.

References

External links
Indianapolis Colts bio
Buffalo Bills bio
Morgan State Bears bio
South Florida Bulls bio

1985 births
Living people
American football running backs
Buffalo Bills players
Edmonton Elks players
Indianapolis Colts players
Morgan State Bears football players
Players of American football from Miami
South Florida Bulls football players
Miami Edison Senior High School alumni
Winnipeg Blue Bombers players
Players of Canadian football from Miami